Korean fried chicken, usually called chikin (from the English "chicken") in Korea, refers to a variety of fried chicken dishes created in South Korea, including the basic huraideu-chicken (from the English "fried chicken") and spicy yangnyeom chicken ("seasoned chicken"). In South Korea, fried chicken is consumed as a meal, an appetizer, anju (food that is served and eaten with drinks), or as an after-meal snack.

Korean fried chicken was described by Julia Moskin of The New York Times as a "thin, crackly and almost transparent crust". The chicken is usually seasoned with spices, sugar, and salt, prior to and after being fried. Korean fried chicken restaurants commonly use small- or medium-sized chickens; these younger chickens result in more tender meat. After frying, the chicken is usually hand-painted with sauce using a brush in order to evenly coat the chicken with a thin layer. Pickled radishes and beer (or carbonated drink) are often served with Korean fried chicken.

Terminology 
The Korean word chikin refers to fried chicken (and occasionally also to roasted chicken), while the name for the domesticated fowl is dak. The word is shortened from peuraideu chikin, which is a transliteration of the English phrase "fried chicken". According to the National Institute of Korean Language, the word chikin refers to "a dish made by coating chopped chicken with flour, and frying or baking it". Fried chicken that is not chopped before frying is called tongdak ("whole chicken"). Both chikin and tongdak are occasionally referred to as dak-twigim ("chicken fritter").

The unshortened form peuraideu chikin, despite being the "correct" transliteration, is not as popular in Korea. The more commonly used form, huraideu-chikin, may have been adopted in Korean owing to residual influence from the Japanese convention that persisted in Korea in the 1970s. (The Japanese forced occupation only ended in 1945.) The phrase huraideu-chikin is often shortened to huraideu and refers to a fried chicken dish without the added seasonings post-frying. This is often used to differentiate it from yangnyeom-chikin ("seasoned chicken"). The National Institute of Korean Language does not recognize huraideu-chikin as the conventional name, but insists on the transliteration (and transvocalization) peuraideu-chikin, which it also insists should be "refined" to dakgogi-twigim ("chicken meat fritter").

History 
The recipe for frying chicken was already a form of cooking in the 15th century, so it is presumed that it has been cooked since the Goryeo Dynasty. Fried chicken was cooked and served with a special seasoning made of vinegar and soy sauce under the name of "Pogye" (포계) in early Joseon dynasty.

The trend of eating chicken began in Korea during the late 1960s, when Myeongdong Yeongyang Center in Seoul began selling whole chicken roasted over an electric oven. It was not until the 1970s when cooking oil was widely available that the modern fried chicken started appearing in Korea. The first modern Korean fried chicken franchise, Lims Chicken, was established in 1977 in the basement of Shinsegae Department Store, Chungmu-ro, Seoul by Yu Seok-ho. Yu stated that his idea of selling smaller, individual pieces of fried chicken in Korea came along in 1975 when he went to go study abroad in the United States. He began frying chicken there, and received accolades for creating 'ginseng chicken'. He started his business in Korea with six pieces of fried chicken between ￦280 to ￦330, and sold around 900 pieces as his beginning career. It was "embraced as an excellent food pairing for draft beer"; the word for the pairing, "chimaek", is a portmanteau of "chicken" and "maekju", the Korean word for beer.

The well-known variety with spicy coatings, also known as yangnyeom-chikin, had its history begin in 1982 by Yun Jonggye, who was running a fried chicken restaurant (later Mexican Chicken) at Daegu. He noticed that customers in his restaurant were struggling to chew on the hard, crisp layers of the fried chicken, and led to inconveniences such as scraped palates. Yun decided to pull a twist on the traditional fried chicken to soften the hard shells of the chicken, and appease more Korean customers by marinating it sweet and spicy. Yang states that despite the spicy flavor, the very first yangnyeom-chikin did not include gochujang as one of their marinating ingredients.

Fried chicken was further popularized when Kentucky Fried Chicken opened stores in South Korea in 1984.

The Asian financial crisis in the late 1990s contributed to the number of restaurants selling fried chicken as laid off workers opened chicken restaurants. In recent years, owing to market saturation in Korea, many of Korea's major fried chicken chains, such as Mexicana Chicken, Genesis BBQ, Kyochon Chicken and Pelicana Chicken, have expanded to set up new presences in the United States, China, Canada, and Southeast Asia.

By 2013 there were more than 20,000 fried chicken restaurants in South Korea serving fried chicken and by 2017, 36,000. Almost a third of the chicken consumed in South Korea is fried; Smithsonian calls it a "ubiquitous staple".

During the COVID-19 pandemic, international chain Bonchon was one of few restaurant chains to continue to add stores.

Varieties

By seasoning 
 Huraideu-chikin ("fried chicken") – often simply referred to as huraideu, this is the basic fried chicken.
 Yangnyeom-chikin ("seasoned chicken") – fried chicken coated in gochujang-based sweet and spicy sauce.
 Banban ("half-half") – shortened from yangnyeom ban, huraideu ban ("half yangnyeom, half huraideu") is often used to refer to chicken that is served half seasoned and half plain.
 Ganjang-chikin ("soy sauce chicken") – fried chicken coated in ganjang-based sweet and savoury sauce, which is often also garlicky. 
 Padak ("scallion chicken") – fried chicken topped with or smothered with a large amount of thinly shredded scallions.
Honey-Chikin (허니 치킨, "honey sauce chicken") - It is based on soy sauce like soy sauce chicken, but it is characterized by sweeter and more sticky with honey.

By style 
 Tongdak ("whole chicken") – also called yennal-tongdak ("old-time whole chicken"), this is a 1970s-style whole chicken deep-fried in oil.
 Sunsal-chikin ("pure flesh chicken") – boneless chicken.

Korean brands 

 bb.q Chicken (an abbreviation for “best of the best quality”, not barbecue), which has featured in numerous Korean dramas like Guardian: The Lonely and Great God and Crash Landing on You
 BHC
 Bonchon Chicken (본촌치킨)
Buloman Sutbul Barbecue (불로만 숯불 바베큐)
Chungman Chicken (충만치킨)
Dasarang (다사랑)
 Goobne Chicken (굽네치킨)
 Jadam Chicken (자담치킨), the first and only Korean fried chicken brand that uses Animal welfare certified chicken since 2017
 Kyochon (교촌)
Mexicana (멕시카나)
 Nene Chicken (네네치킨)
Norang Tongdak (노랑통닭)
 Puradak (푸라닭)
Gcova Chicken (지코바치킨)
 Han's Chimaek (한스 치맥)

See also 

 Chimaek

References 

Deep fried foods
South Korean chicken dishes
Fried chicken